Philippe Gardent may refer to:

Philippe Gardent (rugby league) (born 1979), French rugby league player and former American football player
Philippe Gardent (handballer) (born 1964), French Olympic handball player